The St. Marys River, St. Mary's River, or St. Mary River may refer to:

Canada
St. Mary River (British Columbia), tributary of the Kootenay River
St. Mary's River (Nova Scotia), an important Nova Scotia salmon river

United States
St. Marys River (Florida–Georgia), forming a portion of the boundary between Georgia and Florida
St. Marys River (Indiana and Ohio), tributary of the Maumee River
St. Marys River (Maryland), tributary of the Chesapeake Bay
Saint Marys River (Virginia), tributary of the South River

Multi-national
St. Mary River (Alberta–Montana), tributary of the Saskatchewan River in Montana and Alberta
St. Marys River (Michigan–Ontario), connecting Lake Superior and Lake Huron and forming a portion of the international boundary between the U.S. and Canada

See also
 Mary River (disambiguation)
 Marys River (disambiguation)
 Saint Maries River
 St. Mary's (disambiguation)